William de Braose (c. 1197 – 2 May 1230) was the son of Reginald de Braose by his first wife, Grecia Briwere. He was an ill-fated member of the House of Braose, a powerful and long-lived dynasty of Marcher Lords.

Biography
William de Braose was born in Brecon, probably between 1197 and 1204. The Welsh, who detested him and his family name, called him Gwilym Ddu, Black William. He succeeded his father in his various lordships in 1227, including Abergavenny and Buellt.

William married Eva Marshal, daughter of William Marshal, 1st Earl of Pembroke.  They had four daughters:
 Isabella de Braose (born c. 1222 – 1248), wife of Prince Dafydd ap Llywelyn
 Maud de Braose (born c. 1224 – 1301), wife of Roger Mortimer, 1st Baron Mortimer another very powerful Marcher dynasty.
 Eleanor de Braose (c. 1226 – 1251), wife of Humphrey (son of Humphrey de Bohun) and mother of Humphrey de Bohun, 3rd Earl of Hereford.
 Eva de Braose (c. 1227 – July 1255), wife of William de Cantilupe (died 1254).

He was captured by the Welsh forces of Prince Llywelyn the Great, in fighting in the commote of Ceri near Montgomery, in 1228. William was ransomed for the sum of £2,000 and then furthermore made an alliance with Llywelyn, arranging to marry his daughter Isabella de Braose to Llywelyn's only legitimate son Dafydd ap Llywelyn. However, it became known that William had committed adultery with Llywelyn's wife, Joan, Lady of Wales, and Braose was taken at his own home and transported to Wales. The marriage planned between their two children did, however, take place.

The Chronicle of Ystrad Fflur's entry for 1230 reads:
"In this year William de Breos the Younger, lord of Brycheiniog, was hanged by the Lord Llywelyn in Gwynedd, after he had been caught in Llywelyn's chamber with the king of England's daughter, Llywelyn's wife".

Llywelyn had William publicly hanged on 2 May 1230, possibly at Crogen, near Bala, though others believe the hanging took place near Llywelyn's palace at Abergwyngregyn.

After William's death, his wife Eva continued to hold de Braose lands and castles in her own right. She was listed as the holder of Totnes in 1230, and was granted 12 marks to strengthen Hay Castle by King Henry III on the Close Rolls (1234–1237).

Legacy
With William's death by hanging and his having four daughters, who divided the de Braose inheritance between them and no male heir, the titles now passed to the junior branch of the de Braose dynasty, and the only male heir was now John de Braose who had already inherited the titles of Gower and Bramber from his far-sighted uncle Reginald de Braose.

Literature
Sion Eirian – The Royal Bed (play) 2015 adaptation and Siwan (play) 
Saunders Lewis – Siwan
Thomas Parry – Llywelyn Fawr (play)
Edith Pargeter – The Green Branch (novel)
Sharon Penman – Here Be Dragons (novel)

Notes

Further reading

External links
Eva Marshal page and pictures
William de Braose page
The Barons de Braose A history of the de Braose family in England

1197 births
1230 deaths
People from Brecon
Anglo-Normans
Norman warriors
Anglo-Normans in Wales
Executed English people
13th-century executions by England
Feudal barons of Abergavenny